Shiprock Associated Schools, Inc. (SASI) is an organization that operates two schools associated with the Bureau of Indian Education (BIE) in Shiprock, New Mexico:
 Atsá Biyáázh Community School (elementary)
 Northwest Middle & High School

The National Center for Education Statistics (NCES) counts them as two separate schools.

The organization has a dormitory for its students.

History
The organization was established in 1979 as Shiprock Alternative Schools, Inc.

Northwest Middle & High School
It was formerly known as Shiprock Northwest Alternative High School. Its original purpose was to cater to students who encountered problems in traditional schools.

Prior to 2012 the school system began seeking a conventional school counselor, which it hired by 2012. Alysa Landry of Albuquerque Journal wrote that "Adding the position was part of the schools’ effort to change their image from an alternative education setting to a more mainstream environment."

Athletics
In 1997 the New Mexico Activities Association added Shiprock Northwest to league 1A.

References

Further reading

External links
 Shiprock Associated Schools, Inc.

Native American boarding schools
Public boarding schools in the United States
Boarding schools in New Mexico
Education in San Juan County, New Mexico
1976 establishments in New Mexico
Educational institutions established in 1976
Native American history of New Mexico